Poul Christian Dalsager (5 March 1929 – 2 May 2001) was a Danish Social Democrats politician.

He was minister of agriculture in the second cabinet of Anker Jørgensen, from February 1975 to August 1978, and minister of fisheries February 1975 to February 1977.

In the fourth cabinet of Anker Jørgensen, Dalsager was minister of agriculture and fisheries from October 1979 to January 1981.

From 1981 to 1985, he was European Commissioner for Agriculture in the Thorn Commission.

He was mayor of Hjørring Municipality from 1990 to 1995, when he retired due to illness.

Source 
 HVEM-HVAD-HVOR 1976, Politikens Forlag, København 1975.

1929 births
2001 deaths
Agriculture ministers of Denmark
Social Democrats (Denmark) politicians
Danish European Commissioners
Mayors of places in Denmark
European Commissioners 1981–1985